Old Crow River is a transnational stream,  long, that begins in the U.S. state of Alaska and flows generally southeast to meet the Porcupine River in the Canadian territory of Yukon. In turn, the Porcupine, a tributary of the Yukon River, flows back into the United States, and its water eventually reaches the Bering Sea.

Archaeology finds

Richard E. Morlan of the Canadian Museum of Civilization and Archaeological Survey of Canada conducted a study of modified bones found on Old Crow River sites in the 1970s.  Morlan stated that the bones found exhibited signs of intentional human work before the bones were fossilized.  This would suggest humans were in Canada during the late Pleistocene.  This would place humans in the Americas earlier than thought by scientists.

Later R.M. Thorson and R.D. Guthrie tried to refute Morlan's research in a study they conducted.  Thorson and Guthrie claimed that river action could cause the markings on the bones that Morlan attributed to humans. 
Morlan believed Thorson's experiments have not shown that all the altered fossils from Old Crow Basin can be attributed to river icing and breakup.

See also
List of rivers of Alaska

References

Rivers of Yukon
Tributaries of the Yukon River
Rivers of Alaska